Behrokh Khoshnevis is the President and CEO of Contour Crafting Corporation and the Louise L. Dunn Distinguished Professor of Engineering at the University of Southern California (USC), where he has affiliations with the Aerospace & Mechanical Engineering, Astronautics Engineering, Civil & Environmental Engineering and Industrial & Systems Engineering departments. He is the Director of the Center for Rapid Automated Fabrication Technologies (CRAFT) at USC. He is a Member of the National Academy of Engineering, a Fellow Member of the National Academy of Inventors and is a Fellow of the American Society for the Advancement of Science. He is also a Fellow member of the Society for Computer Simulation International, a Fellow member of the Institute of Industrial & Systems Engineering and a Fellow member of the Society of Manufacturing Engineers. He is also a NASA Innovative Advanced Concepts (NIAC) Fellow.

He is active in CAD/CAM-, robotics- and mechatronics-related research projects that include the development of three novel 3D printing processes called Contour Crafting, SIS and SSS.

In 2014, Khoshnevis was selected as the recipient of the Grand Prize of the Creating the Future design contest for invention of the Contour Crafting robotic construction technology. The program was organized by NASA Tech Briefs Media Group and sponsored by major industries including Intel and HP. The Grand Prize was given to only one of the more than 1000 globally competing technologies.

Contour Crafting was selected as one of the top 25 out of more than 4000 candidate inventions by the History Channel Modern Marvels program and the National Inventor's Hall of Fame; and has been identified as one of the major disruptive technologies of our time.

In 2016 Khoshnevis' other invention, SSS, won another NASA international top prize for the In-Situ Challenge Competition which concerned technologies that can build structures on the Moon and Mars out of local planetary materials. Khoshnevis proposed a proven approach using his SSS technology for autonomous construction of landing pads and roads as well as fabrication of interlocking bricks and other objects such as metallic tools and spare parts using in-situ materials (https://news.usc.edu/97707/new-3-d-printing-process-could-lead-to-construction-on-mars-and-the-moon/).

In 2017 Khoshnevis was recognized by the Connected World Magazine as one of top 10 academic pioneers in Internet of Things (IoT), joining, for example, Elon Musk as another IoT pioneer.

Khoshnevis' inventions have received worldwide attention by the acclaimed media such as The New York Times, Los Angeles Times, Business Week, Der Spiegel, New Scientist, and national and international television and radio networks.

Education 
Khoshnevis received his B.S. degree in Industrial Engineering from Sharif University of Technology in 1974. He received his M.S. in 1975 and his Ph.D. in Industrial Engineering and Management from Oklahoma State University in 1979.

Academic life 
Khoshnevis's educational activities at USC include the teaching of a graduate course on Invention and Technology Development. He routinely conducts lectures and seminars on the subject of invention. He has supervised 34 Ph.D. theses and 4 post-doctoral researchers at USC.

Inventions 
Khoshnevis holds more than 100 patents worldwide in the fields of robotics, automation, fabrication technologies, oil and gas and renewable energy technologies, mechatronics systems for biomedical applications, tactile sensing devices, etc.

Contour Crafting 
Contour Crafting (CC) is a layered fabrication technology that can be used in automated construction of whole structures as well as subcomponents. Using this process, a single house
or a colony of houses, each with possibly a different design, may be automatically constructed in a single run, imbedded in each house all the conduits for electrical, plumbing and air-conditioning

SIS 
SIS is an additive manufacturing (AM) technology in which parts are built layer-by-layer from a powder base material. The core idea of the SIS process is the prevention of selected areas of powder layers from sintering. SIS may be considered a contrary approach to the Selective Laser Sintering (SLS) process in which selected areas of powder are sintered by a fine laser beam. SIS takes advantage of bulk sintering in the body of the part, while inhibiting sintering at the part boundaries 
.

Awards, achievements and media 
In 2014, Khoshnevis was selected as the recipient of the Grand Prize of the Creating the Future design contest for invention of the Contour Crafting robotic construction technology. The program was organized by NASA Tech Briefs Media Group and sponsored by major industries including Intel and HP. The Grand Prize was given to only one of the more than 1000 globally competing technologies.

Contour Crafting was selected as one of the top 25 out of more than 4000 candidate inventions by the History Channel Modern Marvels program and the National Inventor's Hall of Fame; and has been identified as one of the major disruptive technologies of our time. Contour Crafting has been exhibited at numerous museums worldwide.

In 2016 Khoshnevis' other invention, SSS, won another NASA international top prize for the In-Situ Challenge Competition which concerned technologies that can build structures on the Moon and Mars out of local planetary materials. Khoshnevis proposed a proven approach using his SSS technology for autonomous construction of landing pads and roads as well as fabrication of interlocking bricks and other objects such as metallic tools and spare parts using in-situ materials (https://news.usc.edu/97707/new-3-d-printing-process-could-lead-to-construction-on-mars-and-the-moon.

Khoshnevis' inventions have received worldwide attention media such as The New York Times, Los Angeles Times, Business Week, Der Spiegel, New Scientist, and national and international television and radio networks.

In 2012, he featured in a TEDx presentation on automated construction has been ranked by the TED organization as one of top five among more than 30,000 TEDx talks and has been viewed over a million times (as of Dec 2013) and counting.
Khoshnevis was awarded Fellow status, NASA Innovative Advanced Concept (NIAC), 2011.

In 2018, he received the Pioneering award during the first RILEM digital concrete conference for its outstanding contribution to the field of concrete digital fabrication.

In 2019, he was elected a member of the National Academy of Engineering for innovations in manufacturing and construction, including the application of 3D printing methods.

References

21st-century American engineers
21st-century American inventors
Living people
Iranian engineers
Sharif University of Technology alumni
Oklahoma State University alumni
University of Southern California faculty
Year of birth missing (living people)